Triangle Town Center is a shopping mall in Raleigh, North Carolina. It is located in North Raleigh off U.S. Highway 1 (Capital Boulevard) and Interstate 540. The current anchors at the mall are Belk, Dillard's, Macy's, and Saks Fifth Avenue.  Previously the mall housed a Sears store which closed in 2021 and sits vacant as of March 2023

History 
Triangle Town Center opened on August 14, 2002 with anchors Hudson Belk, Sears (closed 2021), Dillard's, and Hecht's (now Macy's). Construction of the mall required re-routing of existing roads. Saks Fifth Avenue, the state's first, opened later in 2004. The mall features a two-level Barnes & Noble, which serves as a junior anchor.

On October 10, 2018, a water main broke causing the mall to evacuate and close early. The mall reopened a week later, with some stores closing for several months for renovations, including H&M, Kay Jewelers, and Zales Jewelers. Those stores never reopened per news released from their parent companies that they were closing stores due to the COVID-19 pandemic. On August 6, 2021, it was announced that Sears would be closing by October 10, 2021. Kohan Retail Investment Group purchased the mall  in November 2021 for $33.25 million.

Anchors
 Belk  Signed as Hudson Belk until 2010
 Dillard's  
 Macy's  formerly Hecht's until 2006
 Saks Fifth Avenue

Former anchors
 Sears  (closed 2021)
 Hecht's (became Macy's in 2006)

Foreclosure 
On July 2, 2019, CBL and Associates, the previous owner of Triangle Town Center, was "heading into foreclosure" after defaulting on the mall's $171 million loan. The first bids for the mall were made on July 11, 2019. It was purchased by LNR Partners

References

External links
 Triangle Town Center website

Shopping malls in Raleigh, North Carolina
Shopping malls established in 2002
2002 establishments in North Carolina
Kohan Retail Investment Group